Mount Ku is a mountain massif in the Karkaraly District, Karaganda Region, Kazakhstan.

Yegindybulak village lies at the feet of the southwestern slopes of the mountain. The Ku Zazaznik, a  protected area, is located in Mount Ku.

Geography   
Mount Ku is part of the Kazakh Upland system (Saryarka). It is a compact-shaped range of moderate altitude located in the northeastern sector of the highlands.

There are springs at the foot of the mountains.

Flora
The summits of Mont Ku are rocky. The soil is dark brown. Sparse pine forests grow on some of the lower slope areas. The valleys and small gorges have shrub growth, as well as willow and birch thickets.

See also
Geography of Kazakhstan

References

External links
Кариагашский, Каркаралинский, Кувский зоологические заказники

Kazakh Uplands

ru:Ку (горы)